Daminda Kolugala (born 3 June 1972) is a Sri Lankan former first-class cricketer who played for Kandy Cricket Club and Moors Sports Club.

References

External links
 

1972 births
Living people
Sri Lankan cricketers
Kandy Cricket Club cricketers
Moors Sports Club cricketers
Sportspeople from Kandy